Prince Souvannarath (8 July 1893 – 23 June 1960) was the 3rd prime minister of the Kingdom of Laos from 1947 – 1948. He was a son of Prince Bounkhong and half-brother to Princes Phetsarath, Souvanna Phouma and Souphanouvong.

References 

Laotian royalty
Prime Ministers of Laos
1893 births
1960 deaths